Jesthata Padak III (Bengali: জ্যেষ্ঠতা পদক ৩), is a military medal of Bangladesh. The medal is intended for awarding members of the armed forces for 27 years or more of impeccable service. JP-3 conferrable on completion of 27 yrs unblemished service career

References 

Military awards and decorations of Bangladesh